Dimitar Kuzmanov (nickname: Miko; born 28 July 1993) is a Bulgarian professional tennis player. He competes mostly on the ATP Challenger Tour. His highest singles ranking is No. 159 achieved on 29 August 2022, whilst his best doubles ranking is No. 438 achieved on 1 April 2019.

Early years and personal life
Dimitar Kuzmanov was born in Plovdiv, Bulgaria, the son of Savko Kuzmanov (an aeronautical engineer) and Dora Rangelova (Bulgaria Fed Cup team's former tennis player and present team captain). His maternal family is entirely related to the sport. Dora's father Zdravko Rangelov, who is one of the founders of tennis in Plovdiv, has been a tennis player and longtime coach in Tennis Club Lokomotiv, whilst her mother has been a volleyball player and coach. Dora's brother, Stefan Rangelov is a former tennis player and present tennis coach. Kuzmanov began playing tennis at age of six when his mother Dora took him to play on courts of Tennis Club Lokomotiv Plovdiv, and Stefan was the man, that gave him a tennis racket and started training.
Through the years, Dimitar Kuzmanov has established himself as a player who has won many national and international tournaments, he is a champion of Bulgaria in different age groups and participant in Bulgaria national tennis teams, including Davis Cup team.

Junior career

2005–2007: Tennis Europe Junior Tour
Dimitar Kuzmanov joined the Tennis Europe Junior Tour competition in 2005.
During this period he played very successfully, achieving a record of 57–16 W/L (MD only) and No. 1 in Tennis Europe Junior Ranking (see below). 
He won 5 (singles) titles: 
Dema Cup U12 – Sofia and Haskovo Cup U16 – Haskovo, in Bulgaria; Novi Sad Open Raiffeisen Cup U16 – Novi Sad, Serbia; 45th Torneo del Avvenire U16 – Milan and 5th Edizione Torneo Int. U16 Memorial Tato Serina – Crema in Italy and 2 (doubles) titles: Dema Cup U12 – Sofia, Bulgaria and ''Novi Sad open Raiffeisen Cup U16 – Novi Sad, Serbia.

In addition, Kuzmanov played final of the tournaments: 
BBB Cup U14 – Sofia, Bulgaria; Trofeo Ajuntament De Torello U16 – Torello, Spain; 6th Citta di Montecatini U16 – Montecatini, Italy; Le Pont des Generations U16 – Le Pont, France; Bergant Memorial 2008 U16 – Maribor, Slovenia and semi-final of the tournaments: Bankia Cup U14 – Bankia, Bulgaria; Citta di Pescara U14 – Pescara, Italy; Tennis Jungsten Cup U14 – Koln, Germany; Raiffeisen Jason Cup U16 – Novi Sad, Serbia; Galeja Open Raiffeisen Cup U16 – Maribor, Slovenia and Mondial Paris Cadets Trophee Lagardere U16 – Paris, France.

In 2007 Kuzmanov played semi-final at East European Tennis Championship U14 – Tallinn, Estonia.

Because of his performance in the tournament, he was invited in ITF U14 & U16 Development Programme, that supported him from 2007 to 2009. As a result, 2009 became most successful year of this period (see below).

2008–2011: ITF Junior Tennis
Kuzmanov started playing in ITF Junior Circuit in 2008 and even in his third participation in tournaments of this level he reached to a final – it happened at Dema Cup U18 – Sofia, Bulgaria, where he lost in a very competitive match. During the period 2008 – 2011 he made a record of 53–24 W/L in singles matches and 17–18 W/L in doubles matches in the main draw only.
His most significant achievements are reaching to a final singles match at 2011 European Junior Championships U18 – Klosters, Switzerland and semi-final doubles match at 2011 Roland Garros Junior Championships U18 – Paris, France, as well as winning 2 singles titles at Plovdiv Cup U18 – Plovdiv and Kenana CUP U18 – Haskovo in Bulgaria.
In addition, Kuzmanov played 4 singles finals: 12th Serbia Junior Open U18 – Novi Sad, Serbia; Plovdiv Cup U18 – Plovdiv, Bulgaria; 33rd Profstav Slovakia Cup U18 – 2011 – Piestani, Slovakia; Dema Cup U18  – Sofia, Bulgaria and 2 doubles finals: Plovdiv Cup U18  – Plovdiv, Bulgaria and Copa Milo-ChileDeportes 2010 U18 – Santiago, Chile as well as 1 singles semi-final: 23rd Czech International Junior Indoor Championships U18 – Prerov, Czech Republic.

Professional career

2009–2010: Professional debut
Dimitar Kuzmanov made his professional debut at Bulgaria F2 ITF Futures Tournament – at age of 15 years and 9 months. Late in season, he played 2 more ITF Futures tournaments and won his first ATP ranking points. He continued to play tournaments at Tennis Europe and ITF Junior level and this year is definitely one of his most successful years as a junior player. Kuzmanov rose to No. 1 for Boys U16 in Tennis Europe Ranking (26 June 2009) and was honored as "Player of the Tennis Europe Junior for Boys U16 – 2009"
 becoming the first Bulgarian in the history who had won this prestigious award for this age group. He finished the year as No. 1 in Tennis Europe Ranking.

He continued to play ITF Junior Circuit and ITF Futures tournaments. He won the Academic Tennis tournament, organised by Bulgarian Tennis Federation.

2011: Davis Cup and top 1000 debut

The last year of playing ITF Junior Circuit tournaments was the most successful at this level. 
Kuzmanov became European vice-champion at 2011 European Junior Championships for Boys U18 – Klosters, Switzerland and played doubles semifinal (Partnering with Miki Jamkovic, SRB) at 2011 ITF Roland Garos Junior Championships – Paris, France. He raised his ATP ranking up to position No. 898 at the year end.

2011 is important as it is the year of Dimitar Kuzmanov's first participation at Davis Cup Event (vs. Belarus and later vs. Cyprus).

2012: First doubles ITF title
He won his first doubles title at ITF Futures F10 Tournament – Antalya, Turkey, partnering compatriot Tihomir Grozdanov. Late during the season, he played few singles and doubles finals and semi-finals at ITF Futures tournaments. As a Davis Cup player he played vs. Albania, Georgia and Macedonia.

2013: First singles ITF title, top 500 debut

First singles title at Greece F5 ITF Futures Tournament (vs. Andrew Whittington (AUS) 6–1 6–2).

Late during the season, he won one more singles title at Greece F15 ITF Futures Tournament (vs. Torsten Wietoska (GER) 6–1 6–2) and played few singles and doubles finals and semi finals at ITF Futures tournaments.

First participation in the qualifying draw singles (QDS) at ATP Challenger Tour – Petange Challenger, Luxembourg. As a Davis Cup player he played vs. Finland and Estonia.

2014–2015: Challenger and top 300 debut
First participation in the main draw singles (MDS) at the ATP Challenger Tour – Istanbul Challenger, Turkey.                                                                                                                                        Late during the season, he won 4 singles titles and 1 doubles title, played few singles and doubles finals and semifinals at ITF Futures tournaments.

In 2015 Kuzmanov continued to play ITF Futures tournaments and reached 8 singles finals, winning 5 titles and 4 doubles finals, winning 3 titles, as well as he played 2 singles and 2 doubles semi-finals. 
Late during the season, he made his debut in the qualifying draw singles (QDS) at the ATP World Tour 250 tournament in Istanbul and reached the quarterfinals of the ATP Challenger Sibiu Open in Romania. As a Davis Cup player he played vs. Latvia, Luxembourg and Hungary.

2016: ATP debut as a wildcard at the Sofia Open

Kuzmanov received a wildcard for the ATP World Tour 250 tournament Sofia Open and made his ATP main draw debut, losing in three sets by the world No. 96 Ričardas Berankis. Partnering with compatriot Alexander Lazov he played vs. future tournament champions Matwe Middelkoop and Wesley Koolhof, losing in three sets. Late during the season, he played five singles finals, one doubles final, one singles and one doubles semi-finals at ITF Futures level, as well as QF at ATP Challenger Tour Marburg Open, Germany. As a Davis Cup player Kuzmanov played vs. Turkey and was nominated to play vs. Tunisia, but he didn't play because of trauma.

2017: First top-100 win
In this year Kuzmanov continued to play ITF Futures tournaments and won singles title No. 12 and Doubles title No. 6. In addition during the season, he reached 1 singles and 1 doubles finals and 4 singles and 4 doubles semi-finals at this level tournaments. In February he participated at the ATP World Tour 250 tournament 2017 Sofia Open. In a MDS first round match he lost 4-6/3-6 to world No. 57 Robin Haase (NED). Partnering with compatriot Alexander Lazov he played in the main draw doubles (MDD) and won 6-4/6-7(9)/10-7 vs. Ariel Behar and Andrei Vasilevski. In the quarterfinal match vs. Alexander Peya and Mate Pavic they lost 2-6/4-6. 

Closing the season Kuzmanov participated in 1 ITF Futures tournament and 4 ATP Challenger Tour events in South America achieving 18 wins in 22 matches. His most successful participation in the tour was at the Lima Challenger Event – a quarterfinal showing in MDS where he lost to world No. 108 Marco Cecchinato (ITA) 6–7(3)/3-6. Before that, however, he managed to record his first victory over a top 100 player – in the match against Roberto Carballes Baena (ESP).  The participation at Santiago 2 Challenger Event was also successful – partnering with Gonçalo Oliveira (POR) he reached the quarterfinals  in MDD, losing 1-6/3-6/ by the Brazilian players Guilherme Clezar and Fabricio Neis. As a Davis Cup player Kuzmanov played vs. Armenia, Greece and Ireland winning all his own single matches.

2018–2019: Fourth Sofia Open wildcard 
Dimitar Kuzmanov started the year in a remarkable way – he participated in January and February in 4 ITF Futures tournaments winning two of them, and the other two playing the final with 18 victories and only 2 losses. In addition, between these tournaments he participated at ATP 250 2018 Sofia Open tournament as a wildcard and lost his MDS first round match 6–7(6)/1-6 by the world No. 68 Joao Sousa (POR). Partnering with compatriot Vasko Mladenov he played in MDD and lost 4-6/4-6 by Scott Lipsky (USA) and Divij Sharan (IND).

He participated in the 2019 Sofia Open for the fourth time as a wildcard where he also lost in the first round to Robin Haase in straight sets.

2020–2021: First ATP wins & Challenger title, Major qualifications & Top 200
Kuzmanov participated in the inaugural 2020 ATP Cup as the No. 2 player from Bulgaria, where he recorded his first and second ATP match wins against the No. 2 players from Belgium Steve Darcis and from Moldova Alexander Cozbinov.

In March 2021, Kuzmanov reached his first ATP Challenger final at the Zadar Open in Croatia which he lost 6-2/2-6/6-7(5) to Serbian Nikola Milojevic. It was the longest Challenger final for the season registered at three hours and seven minutes. A week later, in April, he followed with a quarterfinal showing at the Open de Oeiras Challenger. Thanks to these great results, he reached his best singles ranking of World No. 237 in singles.

Kuzmanov made his Grand Slam debut at the 2021 French Open as a qualifier in singles where he lost to No. 12 seeded Bolivian Hugo Dellien in three sets. He also entered the qualifications at the 2021 Wimbledon Championships for the first time in his career where he also lost to Marius Copil in straight sets. He lost in the first round of qualifications to Copil again at the 2021 US Open.

Kuzmanov received a wildcard at the 2021 Sofia Open for the sixth year in a row. He defeated Lorenzo Musetti in a tight three set match over 3 hours to finally record his first win at his home tournament. Kuzmanov became the second Bulgarian to win a match in the main draw in Sofia after Grigor Dimitrov, who won the tournament title in 2017. As a result, he reached a new career-high ranking of No. 218 on 4 October 2021.

In the following week Kuzmanov made another strong showing at the 2021 Sánchez-Casal Cup in Barcelona, where he won his maiden ATP Challenger title, becoming just the fifth Bulgarian champion in ATP Challenger Tour's history and the first since Grigor Dimitrov in 2011. He did not lose a set against former World No. 5 Tommy Robredo, 4th seed Damir Dzumhur, Teymuraz Gabashvili and 2nd seed Alex Molcan en route to the final, in which he beat the top seed Hugo Gaston 6–3 6–0. As a result, he reached a new career-high ranking of No. 189 on 18 October 2021 breaking into the top 200 for the first time.

2022: First Major qualification win, Seventh Sofia Open wildcard
After losing in the first qualifying round in his first three Grand Slam appearances in 2021, Kuzmanov recorded his maiden win at that level at the 2022 Australian Open. The Bulgarian advanced to the second round of qualifying after a 4–6 6–3 7–6(5) win over Daniel Masur before bowing out to Tobias Kamke in the next round.

In February, Kuzmanov defeated the 2nd and 3rd seeds Hugo Grenier and Enzo Couacaud at the Bengaluru Open on the way to his third ATP Challenger final, where he lost in straight sets to top seed Aleksandar Vukic.

In May he reached the third round of qualifying at the 2022 French Open defeating Flavio Cobolli in three sets, getting one step closer to the main draw. He lost to Santiago Rodriguez Taverna in the third round of qualifying.
Kuzmanov repeated his success at the 2022 Wimbledon Championships, where he once again reached the third round of qualifying, but ultimately couldn't make the step further to his maiden main draw appearance, losing out in four sets to Enzo Couacaud.
At the US Open he reached the third round of qualifying for the third time in a row but bowed out to the No. 303 ranked ATP tour debutant Brandon Holt.

For the seventh year in a row Kuzmanov received a main draw wildcard at the 2022 Sofia Open, but he couldn't replicate his last year's success and lost in straight sets to qualifier Ugo Humbert in the first round.

He finished the season in the top 200 for the second year in a row at No. 195 on 21 November 2022. Two days later he was confirmed as a participant at the 2023 United Cup as part of the Bulgarian team.

Coaching
Kuzmanov first and main coach is his uncle Stefan Rangelov.  Kuzmanov was also trained by former tennis player Valentin Dimov and by Bulgaria Fed Cup team's former tennis player and present captain, his mother Dora Rangelova.

Year-end ATP ranking

Challenger and Futures/World Tennis Tour Finals

Singles: 40 (21–19)

Doubles: 11 (6–5)

National participation

Davis Cup (26 wins, 10 losses)

Dimitar Kuzmanov debuted for the Bulgaria Davis Cup team in 2011. Since then he has 18 nominations with 24 ties played, his singles W/L record is 24–6 and doubles W/L record is 2–4 (26–10 overall).

   indicates the result of the Davis Cup match followed by the score, date, place of event, the zonal classification and its phase, and the court surface.

ATP Cup (2 wins, 1 loss)

United Cup (2 wins, 0 losses)

Individual awards

„Young sport talent of Plovdiv for 2006" by Plovdiv Municipality
„Tennis Player of the Year 2009 of Europe for Boys U16“ – Tennis Europe Junior Tour powered by Polar
„Best sportsman for 2009“ by PSS Lokomotiv Plovdiv
„The Best Progressing Young Tennis Player of the Year 2009“ by Bulgarian Tennis Federation
„Sportsman №8 of Best 10 sportsmen of Plovdiv for 2009“ by Plovdiv Municipality
„Young tennis talent for 2010" by Bulgarian Tennis Federation
„Best young tennis player of Bulgaria for 2011" by Bulgarian Tennis Federation
„Young talent of Bulgaria for 2011 – Sport category" by "Dimitar Berbatov" Foundation
„Sportsman №3 of Best 10 young sportsmen of Bulgaria for 2011" by ViaSport
„Sportsman №8 of Best 10 sportsmen of Plovdiv Municipality for 2011" by Plovdiv Municipality
„Sportsman №8 of Best 10 sportsmen of Plovdiv Municipality for 2013" by Plovdiv Municipality
„Sportsman №9 of Best 10 sportsmen of Plovdiv Municipality for 2017" by Plovdiv Municipality
„Sportsman №4 of Best 10 sportsmen of Plovdiv Municipality for 2018" by Plovdiv Municipality

References

External links

 
 
 

Bulgarian male tennis players
1993 births
Living people
Sportspeople from Plovdiv
21st-century Bulgarian people